Pradeep Hegde is a wildlife cameraman and conservation filmmaker from Bangalore, India whose films have been played in several international film festivals. He has worked on several wildlife films and documentaries which were broadcast on Animal planet, Discovery and National Geographic.

Early life 
Pradeep Hegde was born in Sirsi, Karnataka to an agriculturist family. He completed his schooling from Government Primary School, Guntkal and Modern Educational Society, Sirsi. Later he completed his pre-university from Chaitanya PU Colleges Sirsi and later bachelor's degree in life sciences from Christ University, Bangalore.

Filmography 

 Wild Karnataka
 Into the Wild India
 The Last Hop(e)

Awards 

 Special Mention, Nature in Focus 2019
 Selected-Lift Off Sessions
 Selected- Films South Asia
 Winner- Indic Film Festival
International Science Film Festival of India
 Winner- Alt. Eff Film Festival

Books 
 Guhanagari A Book on Urban Wildlife

References 

Indian filmmakers
Cinematographers from Karnataka
Year of birth missing (living people)
Living people